The Center for Open Science is a non-profit technology organization based in Charlottesville, Virginia with a mission to "increase the openness, integrity, and reproducibility of scientific research." Brian Nosek and  Jeffrey Spies founded the organization in January 2013, funded mainly by the Laura and John Arnold Foundation and others.

The organization began with work in reproducibility of psychology research, with the large-scale initiative Reproducibility Project: Psychology. A second reproducibility project for cancer biology research has also been started through a partnership with Science Exchange. In March 2017, the Center published a detailed strategic plan. Brian Nosek posted a letter outlining the history of the Center and future directions. 

In 2021, the Center for Open Science was honored with the Einstein Foundation Award for Promoting Quality in Research in the institutional category for their contribution to fostering research integrity and to improving transparency and accessibility.

Open Science Framework

Reproducibility project 
The Open Science Framework (OSF) is an open source software project that facilitates open collaboration in science research. The framework was initially used to work on a project in the reproducibility of psychology research, but has subsequently become multidisciplinary. The current reproducibility aspect of the project is a crowdsourced empirical investigation of the reproducibility of a variety of studies from psychological literature, sampling from three major journals: Journal of Personality and Social Psychology, Psychological Science, and Journal of Experimental Psychology: Learning, Memory, and Cognition. Scientists from all over the world volunteer to replicate a study of their choosing from these journals, and follow a structured protocol for designing and conducting a high-powered replication of the key effect. The results were published in 2015.

Preprints 
In 2016, OSF started three new preprint services: engrXiv, SocArXiv, and PsyArXiv. It subsequently opened its own preprint server in 2017, OSF Preprints. Its unified search function includes preprints from OSF Preprints, alongside those from other servers such as Preprints.org, Thesis Commons, PeerJ, and multiple ArXiv repositories.

See also
 List of preprint repositories
 Metascience
 Open science
 Replication crisis

References

External links
 
 Open Science Framework (OSF)

Scholarly communication
Open science
Collaborative software
Non-profit organizations based in Charlottesville, Virginia
2013 establishments in Virginia
Metascience-related organizations